The list of shipwrecks in 1903 includes ships sunk, foundered, grounded, or otherwise lost during 1903.

January

2 January

3 January

7 January

8 January

9 January

13 January

16 January

17 January

21 January

22 January

23 January

25 January

29 January

30 January

February

1 February

2 February

4 February

5 February

6 February

7 February

8 February

11 February

16 February

17 February

18 February

20 February

21 February

24 February

26 February

27 February

28 February

Unknown date

March

1 March

2 March

4 March

7 March

9 March

10 March

11 March

12 March

13 March

15 March

19 March

20 March

23 March

24 March

27 March

31 March

Unknown date

April

3 April

13 April

21 April

28 April

29 April

30 April

May

1 May

5 May

6 May

9 May

12 May

18 May

20 May

25 May

26 May

28 May

29 May

30 May

31 May

Unknown date

June

3 June

5 June

7 June

9 June

10 June

12 June

13 June

17 June

23 June

25 June

30 June

July

2 July

8 July

13 July

14 July

17 July

18 July

19 July

22 July

23 July

24 July

25 July

27 July

August

2 August

3 August

4 August

5 August

6 August

7 August

8 August

9 August

11 August

12 August

13 August

17 August

18 August

20 August

21 August

23 August

25 August

26 August

Unknown date

September

2 September

4 September

5 September

7 September

9 September

10 September

11 September

12 September

14 September

15 September

16 September

17 September

19 September

21 September

26 September

27 September

29 September

30 September

Unknown date

October

1 October

3 October

4 October

7 October

8 October

9 October

10 October

11 October

12 October

15 October

17 October

19 October

23 October

25 October

26 October

29 October

30 October

31 October

November

1 November

2 November

3 November

4 November

7 November

9 November

11 November

12 November

13 November

14 November

15 November

17 November

18 November

19 November

20 November

21 November

22 November

27 November

28 November

29 November

30 November

Unknown date

December

1 December

4 December

5 December

6 December

7 December

9 December

12 December

15 December

16 December

18 December

20 December

21 December

24 December

25 December

26 December

27 December

28 December

30 December

31 December

Unknown date

References

1903
 
Ship